In celestial mechanics, the Roche limit, also called Roche radius, is the distance from a celestial body within which a second celestial body, held together only by its own force of gravity, will disintegrate because the first body's tidal forces exceed the second body's self-gravitation. Inside the Roche limit, orbiting material disperses and forms rings, whereas outside the limit, material tends to coalesce. The Roche radius depends on the radius of the first body and on the ratio of the bodies' densities.

The term is named after Édouard Roche, the French astronomer who first calculated this theoretical limit in 1848.

Explanation 

The Roche limit typically applies to a satellite's disintegrating due to tidal forces induced by its primary, the body around which it orbits. Parts of the satellite that are closer to the primary are attracted more strongly by gravity from the primary than parts that are farther away; this disparity effectively pulls the near and far parts of the satellite apart from each other, and if the disparity (combined with any centrifugal effects due to the object's spin) is larger than the force of gravity holding the satellite together, it can pull the satellite apart. Some real satellites, both natural and artificial, can orbit within their Roche limits because they are held together by forces other than gravitation. Objects resting on the surface of such a satellite would be lifted away by tidal forces. A weaker satellite, such as a comet, could be broken up when it passes within its Roche limit.

Since, within the Roche limit, tidal forces overwhelm the gravitational forces that might otherwise hold the satellite together, no satellite can gravitationally coalesce out of smaller particles within that limit. Indeed, almost all known planetary rings are located within their Roche limit. (Notable exceptions are Saturn's E-Ring and Phoebe ring. These two rings could possibly be remnants from the planet's proto-planetary accretion disc that failed to coalesce into moonlets, or conversely have formed when a moon passed within its Roche limit and broke apart.)

The Roche limit is not the only factor that causes comets to break apart. Splitting by thermal stress, internal gas pressure and rotational splitting are other ways for a comet to split under stress.

Determination 
The limiting distance to which a satellite can approach without breaking up depends on the rigidity of the satellite. At one extreme, a completely rigid satellite will maintain its shape until tidal forces break it apart. At the other extreme, a highly fluid satellite gradually deforms leading to increased tidal forces, causing the satellite to elongate, further compounding the tidal forces and causing it to break apart more readily.

Most real satellites would lie somewhere between these two extremes, with tensile strength rendering the satellite neither perfectly rigid nor perfectly fluid. For example, a rubble-pile asteroid will behave more like a fluid than a solid rocky one; an icy body will behave quite rigidly at first but become more fluid as tidal heating accumulates and its ices begin to melt.

But note that, as defined above, the Roche limit refers to a body held together solely by the gravitational forces which cause otherwise unconnected particles to coalesce, thus forming the body in question. The Roche limit is also usually calculated for the case of a circular orbit, although it is straightforward to modify the calculation to apply to the case (for example) of a body passing the primary on a parabolic or hyperbolic trajectory.

Rigid satellites 
The rigid-body Roche limit is a simplified calculation for a spherical satellite. Irregular shapes such as those of tidal deformation on the body or the primary it orbits are neglected. It is assumed to be in hydrostatic equilibrium. These assumptions, although unrealistic, greatly simplify calculations.

The Roche limit for a rigid spherical satellite is the distance, from the primary at which the gravitational force on a test mass at the surface of the object is exactly equal to the tidal force pulling the mass away from the object:

This can be equivalently written as

This does not depend on the size of the objects, but on the ratio of densities. This is the orbital distance inside of which loose material (e.g. regolith) on the surface of the satellite closest to the primary would be pulled away, and likewise material on the side opposite the primary will also go away from, rather than toward, the satellite.

Fluid satellites 
A more accurate approach for calculating the Roche limit takes the deformation of the satellite into account. An extreme example would be a tidally locked liquid satellite orbiting a planet, where any force acting upon the satellite would deform it into a prolate spheroid.

The calculation is complex and its result cannot be represented in an exact algebraic formula. Roche himself derived the following approximate solution for the Roche limit:

However, a better approximation that takes into account the primary's oblateness and the satellite's mass is:

where  is the oblateness of the primary. The numerical factor is calculated with the aid of a computer.

The fluid solution is appropriate for bodies that are only loosely held together, such as a comet. For instance, comet Shoemaker–Levy 9's decaying orbit around Jupiter passed within its Roche limit in July 1992, causing it to fragment into a number of smaller pieces. On its next approach in 1994 the fragments crashed into the planet. Shoemaker–Levy 9 was first observed in 1993, but its orbit indicated that it had been captured by Jupiter a few decades prior.

Exception 

In 2023, it was discovered that the minor planet 50000 Quaoar has a planetary ring. The ring is at a distance over seven times the radius of Quaoar, more than double the Roche limit. The reason for this is not yet understood.

See also 
 Roche lobe
 Chandrasekhar limit
 Hill sphere
 Spaghettification (the extreme case of tidal distortion)
 Black hole
 Triton (moon) (Neptune's satellite)
 Comet Shoemaker–Levy 9

References

Sources 
 Édouard Roche: "La figure d'une masse fluide soumise à l'attraction d'un point éloigné" (The figure of a fluid mass subjected to the attraction of a distant point), part 1, Académie des sciences de Montpellier: Mémoires de la section des sciences, Volume 1 (1849) 243–262. 2.44 is mentioned on page 258. 
 Édouard Roche: "La figure d'une masse fluide soumise à l'attraction d'un point éloigné", part 2, Académie des sciences de Montpellier: Mémoires de la section des sciences, Volume 1 (1850) 333–348. 
 Édouard Roche: "La figure d'une masse fluide soumise à l'attraction d'un point éloigné", part 3, Académie des sciences de Montpellier: Mémoires de la section des sciences, Volume 2 (1851) 21–32. 
 George Howard Darwin, "On the figure and stability of a liquid satellite", Scientific Papers, Volume 3 (1910) 436–524.
 James Hopwood Jeans, Problems of cosmogony and stellar dynamics, Chapter III: Ellipsoidal configurations of equilibrium, 1919.
 S. Chandrasekhar, Ellipsoidal figures of equilibrium (New Haven: Yale University Press, 1969), Chapter 8: The Roche ellipsoids (189–240).

External links 
 Discussion of the Roche Limit
 Audio: Cain/Gay – Astronomy Cast Tidal Forces Across the Universe – August 2007.
 Roche Limit Description from NASA

Gravity
Space science
Tidal forces
Planetary rings
Equations of astronomy